The Carcosa Seri Negara is a residence located on two adjacent hills inside the Perdana Botanical Gardens, Kuala Lumpur, Malaysia. Originally built as the official residence and guest house of the British High Commissioner in Malaya, it is now owned by the Government of Malaysia. The name is a composite of the two colonial mansions located on the compound: the residence, named Carcosa (completed in 1898), and the guest house, now named Seri Negara (1913).

The buildings figured prominently in the Malaysian independence movement, with several meetings held there.  Since Independence in 1957, it has been used as residences for visiting dignitaries (1957–1989), and as a luxury hotel (1989–2015). Since 2017, it has been used as a museum.

Design
Carcosa Seri Negara refers to two buildings, the larger Carcosa and the smaller (and newer) Seri Negara (or King's House).

Carcosa
The Carcosa mansion was built in 1896–1897 as the official residence of Sir Frank Swettenham, the first British High Commissioner of the then Resident-General of the Federated Malay States. It was designed by Arthur Benison Hubback under instruction from the State Engineer of Selangor Public Work Department Charles Edwin Spooner, and sometimes also credited to Arthur Charles Alfred Norman.

According to a letter he wrote in 1936, Swettenham chose the name Carcosa from the name of a mythical city in the horror short story collection The King in Yellow. Swettenham assumed the word was a portmanteau of two Italian words, cara and casa, intended to mean "desirable dwelling".

Seri Negara
Seri Negara ('Beautiful Country' in Malay), was originally known as the Governor's Residence when it was opened in 1913 as the official guest house of Governor of the Straits Settlement. It was later known as the King's House.

History

Colonial Malaya
Swettenham moved into Carcosa during construction, and the official housewarming party was not held until August 28, 1898. During World War II, the headquarters of the Imperial Japanese Army occupation government of Malaya were at Carcosa Seri Negara.

The Constitution of Malaysia was drafted in Seri Negara between 1955 and 1957. The Federation of Malaya Agreement was signed on August 8, 1957, at King's House, and the property was then vacated by the British High Commissioner on August 31, 1957, when it was returned to the Malayan Government. It was then opened as the Istana Tetamu (Guest's Palace), hosting many visiting dignitaries, including Queen Elizabeth II in 1986.

Post-independence
With Malayan independence imminent in September 1956, the Chief Minister of Malaya, Tunku Abdul Rahman, presented the deeds of Carcosa and its  of land to the British Government as a gift, a token of goodwill. He moved a resolution in the Federal Legislative Council which read, "That this Council approve of the proposal to make a free gift of the house and buildings known as "Carcosa", together with the gardens and land attached, as a token of the goodwill of the Malayan people to Her Majesty's Government, for use as the residence and office of the future representative of that government in an Independent Federation." Carcosa then became residence to a succession of post-independence diplomatic British High Commissioners.

The Carcosa "issue" was taken up by young radical politicians, in particular Anwar Ibrahim and Mahathir Mohamad, his mentor. Tun Daim Zainuddin successfully led the campaign for the Malaysian government to own it, yet again. In 1987, possession of the Carcosa estate was returned to the Government of Malaysia.

Hotel
Soon after the acquisition of the estate, the Malaysian government proceeded to repurpose the estate into a hotel, which opened in 1989, by leasing the estate to hospitality companies: first to Malaysia-based Landmark Hotels and Realty from 1989 to 2010 and then to Saujana Hotels & Resorts (the hospitality subsidiary of Malaysia-based Peremba Group) from 2010 to 2016. From 2004 to 2010, Singapore-based General Hotel Management managed day-to-day operations. The lease was set for a renewable 10-year term.

Carcosa and the Guest's Palace both served as hotels, with the latter rebranded as Seri Negara. Marketed as a luxurious heritage boutique hotel, much of the mansions' colonial architecture and interior designs were preserved, carefully adapted, and complemented with colonial-themed hotel service. In its inaugural year as a hotel, Carcosa Seri Negara served as the temporary official residence for Queen Elizabeth II and Prince Philip when the 1989 Commonwealth Heads of Government Meeting was held in Kuala Lumpur. By 2000, Carcosa was subdivided into seven suites, and Seri Negara held six more, each with a personal butler.

After the lease for the estate was officially transferred from Landmark to Saujana in December 2010, only Seri Negara resumed operation as a hotel, carrying the Carcosa Seri Negara brand on its own. Carcosa was largely vacated, confined to limited uses, and had been reported to receive only basic maintenance. After the expiry of Saujana's lease on December 31, 2015, the hotel was entirely closed for business and the estate was placed  under the safekeeping of the property and land management division of the Prime Minister's Department. Plans have been made to assign management of the buildings to the Kuala Lumpur City Hall, with a currently undetermined hospitality company conducting day-to-day operations.

The Logo
The Carcosa Seri Negara Logo was designed by Johan Design Associates (JDA) in 1989.

The Logo was derived from metaphors (involving natural elements, environment, humanity, charm and beauty etc.), in this case a swan, are quite common, especially in the hospitality-related outlets, exotic resorts, nature's goodness, romance and gender-enhanced branding, where specific nuances are drawn into play. It exude perceptions of warm hospitality, sense of wellbeing, nature's exuberance, high society living and dining.

Afternoon Tea
One of Carcosa Seri Negara's trademarks was the English afternoon tea, served in the drawing room, or on the wrap-around verandah, overlooking the gardens. It was served daily.

Museum
In April 2017, the Asian Heritage Museum (AMH) signed a 3-year lease to rent Carcosa Seri Negara until 2020 where all its repairs will be solely taken responsible by the museum body itself. However, within 1 year before the slated handover in March 2019, the AHM was kicked out from the premises by the Federal Land Commissioner without any explanation with a note of seizure sent to them 1 month later.

In popular culture
 Scenes for The 7th Dawn were filmed at Carcosa Seri Negara.
 The residence appeared in an episode of The Amazing Race: All-Stars, in which competing teams checked into a "Pit Stop" on the property.
 The 2018 film Crazy Rich Asians filmed scenes set at the ancestral Young mansion, named Tyersall Park, based on the former estate in Singapore of the same name, at the then-abandoned Carcosa Seri Negara.
 Carcosa Seri Negara serves as the residences of the Blacketts and Mr Webb in the television production of The Singapore Grip.

See also 
Similar British colonial residences:
 The Istana in Singapore.
 Governor's residence in Malacca.
 Suffolk House and The Residency in Penang.

References

Bibliography
1.Journal of Malaysian Branch of the Royal Asiatic Society, June 1997, Dr. A. Ghafar Ahmad

2.

External links

 Official Carcosa Seri Negara website
 An early photo of Carcosa

Houses in Malaysia
Buildings and structures completed in 1898
Buildings and structures completed in 1913